Gavin John Geddes (born 7 October 1972) is an English former professional footballer who played as a winger in the Football League for Brighton & Hove Albion. He also played non-league football for a variety of clubs in Sussex and surrounding counties.

References

1972 births
Living people
People from Hove
English footballers
Association football wingers
Lewes F.C. players
Shoreham F.C. players
Wick F.C. players
Brighton & Hove Albion F.C. players
Crawley Town F.C. players
Saltdean United F.C. players
Worthing F.C. players
Horsham F.C. players
Sutton United F.C. players
Burgess Hill Town F.C. players
Dorking F.C. players
Eastbourne Borough F.C. players
Ashford Town (Middlesex) F.C. players
English Football League players